The Ministry of Public Administration, Home Affairs, Provincial Councils and Local Government is a cabinet ministry of the Government of Sri Lanka responsible for provincial councils and local government. The ministry is responsible for formulating and implementing national policy on provincial councils and Local Government and other subjects which come under its purview. The current Minister of Provincial Councils and Local Government is Dinesh Gunawardena. The ministry's secretary is H. T. Kamal Pathmasiri. The ministry has had oversight of drafting the 20th Amendment to the Sri Lankan Constitution.

Ministers

Secretaries

References

External links
 

Public Administration, Home Affairs, Provincial Councils and Local Government
Public Administration, Home Affairs, Provincial Councils and Local Government
 
Sri Lanka
Members of the Board of Ministers of Ceylon